Hitoshi Taneda (種田 仁, born July 18, 1971) is a former Nippon Professional Baseball infielder.

External links

1970 births
Living people
People from Yao, Osaka
Japanese baseball players
Nippon Professional Baseball infielders
Chunichi Dragons players
Yokohama BayStars players
Saitama Seibu Lions players
Japanese baseball coaches
Nippon Professional Baseball coaches